Engfa Waraha (born 1995), nicknamed Mook (lit. "Pearl"), is a Thai singer and beauty queen from Bangkok province. She was previously known for her first appearance on the seventh season of the Voice Thailand In 2022, she won the national contest of Miss Grand Thailand 2022 as the representative of the capital city Bangkok,. She represented Thailand at Miss Grand International 2022 held in Indonesia on 25 of October, where she placed as first runner up.

Personal life
Engfa was born in Uthai Thani province into a family of musicians; her father was a keyboardist and her mother was a luk thung (Thai pop-country) singer.

Early career
Since she was born into a musician family, caused her to be able to learn musical skills from her parents, and began performing on stage at the age of six. Moreover, her acquaintance and closeness with hometown traditions since childhood inspired her to dream of becoming a Likay, as well as a Thai blessing ceremonial officiant. At the age of 17, due to her father's terminal cancer, she signed a 12-year contract with the Bangkok-based artist management organ "Sangravee Entertainment" to earn some money for the treatment, under such a contract the record label released her four singles; two in 2015 and the rest in 2016. Later in 2013, a year after her father's death, she had the opportunity to meet with a master of the Thai blessing ceremony "Phonraphee Maneethai" who later persuaded her to study and cultivate the aforementioned officiant skill as well as a Thai verse singing until proficient enough to be able to use it for a career. In addition, before entering the national entertainment industry, she also worked as a waitress, greengrocer, food vendor, caddie, and model.

She became known as "Engfa Sangravee" after participating in the seventh season of the Thai reality singing contest The Voice Thailand in 2018 where she was eliminated in the knockout round, the second phase of the contest.

Pageantry
In 2020, Engfa had entered the  contest, a provincial preliminary pageant for Miss Grand Thailand, but had to withdraw due to contract problems with her artist manager organ, which she signed at the age of 17. However, she returned to pageantry again in 2022 and was able to win the crown of  2022 and is dubbed a contestant who has the potential to win the national title of Miss Grand Thailand 2022 since crowning the provincial queen.

After winning the provincial stage, she took part in the Miss Grand Thailand 2022 pageant in April and eventually won the title.

Discography
Single Discography
 2015: Jing Hrue Plao (Is that true?)
 2015: Yuek Yak (Roughly)
 2016: Khao Ma Jeeb Noo Na (He flirts with me)
 2016: Mai Sod Kor Hlob Di (Boot out, the benching) featuring Mila

Footnotes

References

External links
 
 

 

1995 births
Living people
21st-century Thai women singers
Miss Grand Thailand
The Voice (franchise) contestants
People from Uthai Thani province
Thai LGBT singers